Edo Central Senatorial District in Edo State covers five local governments areas which include  Esan South-East, Igueben, Esan North East, Esan West and  Esan Central. The current representative of the Edo Central is Clifford Ordia  of the People's Democratic Party  (PDP).

List of senators representing Edo Central

References 

Politics of Edo State
Senatorial districts in Nigeria
Members of the Senate (Nigeria)